Mercosur Cities Network, or simply Mercocities, is a network that unites a group of municipalities of the countries that participate in the Common Market of the South (Mercosur), whether they are members or associates. This organization of cities aims to promote their integration on a regional scale and stimulate development and cooperation between them.

It currently comprises 353 municipalities of the following South American countries: Argentina, Brazil, Bolivia, Chile, Colombia, Ecuador, Paraguay, Peru, Uruguay and Venezuela.

History 

The idea of creating a Mercosur association of cities came up during the seminar "Mercosur: Opportunities and Challenges for Cities" held in March 1995 in Asunción, Paraguay. The mayors who participated in the meeting, which was convened by the Union of Ibero-American Capital Cities–Southern Cone Sub-region, signed the so-called Declaration of Asuncion, where they expressed the need to create a forum for cooperation among municipalities.

In July 1995, the Porto Alegre Commitment (Brazil) was signed, which defined the main objectives of the new organization. Finally, in November of the same year, she signed the Founding Act of the Mercocities, in Asunción. 

The founding members were the cities of Asunción, Rosario, La Plata, Cordoba, Buenos Aires, Florianópolis, Porto Alegre, Curitiba, Rio de Janeiro, Brasília, Salvador and Montevideo.

Instances of Mercociudades 

Art. 8 of the Statutes stated different instances of work:

The Summit of Heads of Government.
The Assembly is the highest body for deliberation and direction of our Network. It is made up of mayors, mayors and prefects of the associated cities and its sessions are led by the President of Mercociudades. It meets once a year at the Mercocities Summit.
During the Assembly the annual Work Plan is approved, the authorities of that new period assume, and it is at the same time an instance of contact with various regional and world organizations interested in carrying out joint actions. The Assembly concludes with a political declaration.

The Council of Mercociudades.
It is the highest governing body between assemblies and is made up of two cities from each full member country of Mercosur and one city from each associated country, those that make up the Board of Directors and that which is exercised by the Executive Secretariat.

Council 2019-2020:

Argentina: Buenos Aires, Córdoba, Santa Fe, Avellaneda (Santa Fe), General Alvear, Hurlingam, San Justo, Villa María

Brasil: Foz de Iguazú, Porto Alegre, Santana de Parnaíba, Sāo Leopoldo, Sāo Paulo.

Paraguay: Asunción, Itá and Lambaré.

Uruguay: Canelones, Colonia, Lavalleja, Maldonado, Montevideo, Paysandú, San José and Tacuarembó.

Bolivia: La Paz, Sucre and Tarija.

Colombia: Medellín.

Chile: Concepción, Coquimbo, Quilpué, Quilicura, Peñalolén, Puerto Montt and Valparaíso.

Ecuador: Cuenca and Río Bamba.

Perú: Los Aquijes, Parcona, Pueblo Nuevo, and Santiago de Ica.

Executive Direction.
It is made up of three cities: the city that exercises the Executive Secretariat, the city that exercised it in the immediately preceding period, and the city that is close to exercising it. It is a support agency for the Executive Secretariat in the coordination work of the Network.

Executive Direction 2019-2020: Asuncion, La Paz and Tandil.

Presidency.
As the official space of the Network, the Presidency works jointly with the various instances of Mercociudades, specifically convening and presiding over the work meetings of the Council, those of the Executive Directorate, and those of the General Assembly of Members. In each period, this Presidency carries out activities based on a work plan approved at the Network's annual summit.

President 2020: Oscar Rodriguez, Major of Asuncion, Paraguay.

Thematic Vice Presidencies.
The thematic vice-presidencies participate with the right to speak and vote in the Executive Directorate, represent the Network in various regional and international spaces, and assist the President in his responsibilities. They articulate and mobilize the member cities, coordinators, or members of the thematic instances of Mercociudades, related to the thematic area they represent.

Thematic Vice Presidencies 2019-2020:

Sustainable Urban Development And Climate Change: Esteban Echeverría (Argentina) And Prefeito De São Leopoldo (Brazil).

Governance And Cultural Integration: La Paz (Bolivia).

Institutional Relations: Montevideo (Uruguay).

Urban Economy: Porto Alegre (Brazil).

Social Development And Health: Tandil (Argentina).

Executive Secretary.
As the official space of the Network, the Executive Secretariat works jointly with the various instances of Mercociudades, specifically convening and presiding over the work meetings of the Council, and those of the General Assembly of Partners. In each period, this Secretariat carries out activities based on a work plan approved at the Network's annual summit. Its mandate is for one year and begins from the date the General Assembly is held.

Collegiate of Coordinators of Thematic Units: Thematic Units.
The thematic instances disseminate successful experiences, contribute to the formulation of public policies, and promote research. They arise responding to the need of the member cities of the Network to work in various areas of high concern and interest. Currently, it has 15 Thematic Units and 7 Work Groups and Commissions.

Permanent Technical Secretariat.
The Permanent Technical Secretariat of Mercocities is based in Montevideo and is an advisory body to the Executive Secretariat. Its creation was due to the need to develop the institutional memory of the Network; support and advise the technical and administrative work of the Executive Secretariat; follow up on issues and discussions of the integration process, and liaise with the MERCOSUR Secretariat.

Membership 
The Mercocities are:



Cochabamba
 El Alto
 La Paz
 Santa Cruz de la Sierra
 Sucre
 Tarija







{| width=100%
|- valign ="top"
|width=25%|
 Cuenca



Jesús María
 La Victoria
 Lima
 District Lurin



Barquisimeto
 Alcaldía Mayor de Caracas
 Cumaná
 Libertador

References

External links
Official website 
Pages about the Mercocities 

Mercosur
UCLG Sections